Karleen M. Thompson (née Shields; born July 1, 1968) is the associate head coach of the Virginia Cavaliers women's basketball team since 2018. Before joining the Cavaliers, Thompson was a WNBA head coach for the Los Angeles Sparks in 2004 and the Houston Comets from 2007 to 2008. Additionally, Thompson was an assistant coach for the Clemson Tigers women's basketball team from 2010 to 2013 and the Atlanta Dream from 2013 to 2017.

Early life and education
In 1968, Thompson was born in California. While attending high school in Snyder, Texas, Thompson played on the volleyball and basketball teams. For her post-secondary education, Thompson continued playing basketball with Contra Costa College in 1991 before moving to the USC Trojans women's basketball team in 1993.

Career
After completing her social sciences degree at the University of Southern California in 1996, Thompson joined Gatorade as a sports marketer. The following year, Thompson started her Women's National Basketball Association career when she became a manager for the Los Angeles Sparks in 1997. With the Sparks, Thompson moved to assistant coach in 2002 before she was named one of the team's interim head coaches in 2004 after the resignation of head coach Michael Cooper. During the remainder of the 2004 season, Thompson had eleven wins and three losses as co-head coach. At the 2004 WNBA Playoffs, Thompson had one win and two losses before Los Angeles was defeated by the Sacramento Monarchs in the first round.

Upon leaving the Sparks, Thompson was an assistant coach of the Houston Comets between 2005 and 2007. While she was an assistant coach for a Moscow basketball team in 2007, Thompson was named the Comets general manager and head coach. With 30 wins and 38 losses as the Comets' head coach from 2007 to 2008, Thompson left the WNBA to work in college basketball as an assistant coach for the Clemson Tigers women's basketball team from 2010 to 2013. She resumed her WNBA career in 2013 when she became an associate head coach for the Atlanta Dream and held the position until 2017. In 2018, she continued to work as an associate head coach when she was hired by the Virginia Cavaliers women's basketball team.

Personal life
In February 2009, Thompson sued the WNBA in a New York district court lawsuit. In the case, Thompson said she was misled to stay with the WNBA when the organization took over the Comets in March 2008. Additionally, Thompson stated she had lost future job positions when the Comets disbanded in December 2008. The case was dismissed in October 2009 due to a lack of diversity jurisdiction.

References

1968 births
Living people
Atlanta Dream coaches
Basketball coaches from California
Clemson Tigers women's basketball coaches
Houston Comets head coaches
Los Angeles Sparks head coaches
Virginia Cavaliers women's basketball coaches
Basketball coaches from Texas
Basketball players from Texas
People from Snyder, Texas
Contra Costa College alumni
USC Trojans women's basketball players